China Shenhua Energy Company Limited, also known as Shenhua, China Shenhua, or Shenhua Energy, is the largest state-owned coal mining enterprise in Mainland China, and in the world. It is a subsidiary of Shenhua Group. It mines, refines, and sells coal, and generates and sells electric power in the People's Republic of China. It operates coal mines as well as an integrated railway network and a seaport that are primarily used to transport its coal. It also operates power plants in the PRC which are engaged in the generation and sales of coal-based power to provincial and regional electric companies. In the 2020 Forbes Global 2000, China Shenhua Energy was ranked as the 168th -largest public company in the world.

History

On August 15, 2005, China Shenhua Energy became a constituent of Hang Seng China Enterprises Index.

On August 23, 2007, China Shenhua Energy announced that it will issue not more than 1.8 billion A-share to provide rooms for its parent company, China Shenhua Group, to inject the capital into it for its long-term development.

On October 9, 2007, China Shenhua Energy listed A share in the Shanghai Stock Exchange. The closed price at the first trading day was RMB$69.3, 87% higher than its IPO price, RMB 36.99.

On November 7, 2007, Hang Seng Index Services Company announced that China Shenhua would have been Hang Seng Index Constituent Stock since December 10, 2007.

In September 2009, Shenhua announced that over four years they will invest US$39.5 billion in coal to increase their production.

In September 2010, the company agreed to an extensive cooperation contract with Mitsui & Co., encompassing shipping, overseas mine development, coal usage and chemical manufacturing.

In December 2010, Shenhua invested $2 billion in the construction of a railway; financing 35% with its own capital.

In July 2011, Shenhua acquired a 40% stake in Mongolia's biggest coal project, with a Russian syndicate controlling 36% and Peabody Energy owning the remaining 24%.

Carbon footprint
China Shenhua Energy Company reported Total CO2e emissions (Direct + Indirect) for the twelve months ending 31 December 2020 at 134,900 Kt (-22,500 /-14.3% y-o-y). This follows a sharp decline in emissions in 2019.

See also

Coal power in China

References

External links

神華入國企指數成份股
神華能源力爭年底發行18億股A股
預期上限 神華A股首日漲87%
HSI SERVICES ANNOUNCES INDEX REVIEW RESULTS

Coal companies of China
Electric power companies of China
Energy companies established in 1995
Non-renewable resource companies established in 1995
Government-owned companies of China
Companies listed on the Hong Kong Stock Exchange
Companies listed on the Shanghai Stock Exchange
Companies in the CSI 100 Index
Former companies in the Hang Seng Index
H shares